Jaxon may refer to:

Jaxon (name), given name and surname (including a list of people with the name)
Jaxon (cartoonist), American cartoonist, illustrator, historian, and writer
Jaxon (musician) (David Jackson, born 1947), English progressive rock saxophonist, flautist, and composer
Jaxon, a demonym for a person from Jacksonville, Florida

See also
Jaxxon, a green-rabbit like character from Star Wars
Jackson (disambiguation)